Qaraguz-e Salimaqa (also Romanized as Qarāgūz-e Salīmāqā) is a village in Nazluy-ye Jonubi Rural District, in the Central District of Urmia County, West Azerbaijan Province, Iran. At the 2006 census, its population was 182, in 47 families.

References 

Populated places in Urmia County